Grecia is a district of the Grecia canton, in the Alajuela province of Costa Rica.

Geography 
It is in the foothills of the Cordillera Central on the eastern edge of the Central Valley.

Economy
Grecia is part of the tourist route of the western region of the Central Valley of Costa Rica, given the existence in the canton of waterfalls, protected areas, and the Catholic church of Nuestra Señora de las Mercedes, which is part of Costa Rica's historical-architectural heritage.

Culture and education

Iglesia de la Nuestra Señora de las Mercedes

Grecia is noted for its unique church, made entirely of pre-fabricated steel plates painted red. There are several urban legends about this church. One recounts how the church was donated by some foreign country, and sent to Greece as a gift, but was wrongly shipped to Grecia, Costa Rica. Another legend states that the final destination of the church was the city of Punta Arenas in Chile but was disembarked, by mistake, in the port of Puntarenas, Costa Rica, and later sent to the city of Grecia, where it was assembled.

However, records clearly show that the instruction, shipment, and construction of the church were a coordinated effort of Grecia's population, the Catholic Church, the Costa Rican government, and Alejo E. Jiménez Bonnefil (1858–1922), a Costa Rican coffee producer and exporter who was in charge of commanding and importing the church from the manufacturer  in Belgium, in the late 19th century.

Flora and fauna 
A toucan named Grecia is the first toucan to receive a prosthetic beak. Its name is due to where the bird was found injured prior to its admission to the Rescate Wildlife Rescue Center (formerly Rescate Animal Zoo Ave), south of the city.

Demographics 

For the 2011 census, Grecia had a population of  inhabitants.

Transportation

Road transportation 
The district is covered by the following road routes:
 National Route 107
 National Route 118
 National Route 154
 National Route 711

References 

Districts of Alajuela Province
Populated places in Alajuela Province